Yadupatti is an Indian village in the Mithila region of Bihar. This village  is about 37 kilometres away from its district headquarters Sitamarhi. It is about 4 kilometres away from Bhitthamore.

References 

Villages in Sitamarhi district